The Calix Society is an organization in the United States founded in the 1940s which aims at addressing the particular spiritual needs of Catholics recovering from alcohol addiction, though it also ministers to those affected by other addictions. It affiliates closely with Alcoholics Anonymous, and believes in the effectiveness of the twelve-step program, but focuses on enabling Catholics who may have abandoned or neglected their faith during active alcoholism to return and have the fellowship of other Catholics in recovery. It promotes total abstinence for those in recovery, taking inspiration from Matt Talbot, and is concerned with the spiritual development and the sanctification of the whole personality of its members. The organization's motto is "substituting the cup that stupifies for the cup that sanctifies". The group has expanded since the 1940s to have active groups in 19 US states and in the UK.

See also

 Addiction recovery groups
 Al-Anon/Alateen
 Community reinforcement approach and family training
 Drug rehabilitation
 Effectiveness of Alcoholics Anonymous
 Group psychotherapy
 Intervention (counseling)
 List of twelve-step groups
 Recovery approach
 Self-help groups for mental health
 Stepping Stones (house)
 Substance abuse
 Washingtonian movement

References

External links
 Official website

Alcohol abuse
Catholic charities
Drug rehabilitation
Twelve-step programs